The 2014 Czech Republic motorcycle Grand Prix was the eleventh round of the 2014 MotoGP season. It was held at the Masaryk Circuit in Brno on 17 August 2014.

In MotoGP, Marc Márquez was defeated for the first time in the 2014 season, as he could only finish fourth in the race. Instead, it was his Repsol Honda teammate Dani Pedrosa that took the victory, ahead of the Yamahas of Jorge Lorenzo and Valentino Rossi. In Moto2, championship leader Esteve Rabat took his fifth victory of the season, leading home Marc VDS Racing Team teammate Mika Kallio, while the podium was completed by Sandro Cortese, taking his first podium in the class.

The Moto3 race was closely fought, with the points-scoring positions – from the winner to 15th place – covered by just 1.838 seconds at the finish, a record for all Grand Prix races. The race was won by category veteran Alexis Masbou for his first Grand Prix win. Enea Bastianini took his first podium finish in second place, with the podium completed by Danny Kent, his first podium since returning to Moto3. Álex Rins finished down in ninth position, having prematurely celebrated what he thought was a race victory.

Classification

MotoGP

Moto2

Moto3

Championship standings after the race (MotoGP)
Below are the standings for the top five riders and constructors after round eleven has concluded.

Riders' Championship standings

Constructors' Championship standings

 Note: Only the top five positions are included for both sets of standings.

References

Czech
Czech Motorcycle Grand Prix
Czech Republic motorcycle Grand Prix
Czech Republic motorcycle Grand Prix